Michael McCleary is a New Zealand songwriter, composer, performer, producer and director based in Mumbai, India since 2007. He has worked on a large number of advertisements such as for brands like Levi's, Coca-Cola, Vodafone etc. and films such as Waiting, Margarita with a Straw, Shaitan, Shanghai, David, Bombay Velvet, Nautanki Saala, Shaadi Ke Side Effects, Shaandaar etc.

Besides his prolific work on soundtracks for ad-films, background scores and songs for Bollywood films, he is also well known for his re-interpretations of old Bollywood songs under the stage name of The Bartender, most notably Khoya Khoya Chand and Hawa Hawai from Shaitan, Neend Na Mujhko Aaye and Eena Meena Deeka from Shaandaar, Fifi from Bombay Velvet, O Lal Meri / Mast Kalandar from David and Dhak Dhak from Nautanki Saala.
He has also released a one-of-its-kind album of full-length versions of some of his most popular advertisement jingles called TV Dinners.

Personal life
Michael McCleary is a New Zealander who was born in Chennai, Tamil Nadu, India. He lived and worked in London, England for nearly fifteen years and is currently based primarily in Mumbai, India. He studied Composition and Orchestration at the Wellington Conservatorium of Music and at Victoria University of Wellington, then worked as a music producer in London at the Trident Studios among other places. He is married to writer and actor Diksha Basu.

Career in India
McCleary began his career in the Indian industry with a collaboration with Lucky Ali. He was responsible for the music arrangement for the album Sunoh and several subsequent Lucky Ali albums and he has also worked regularly with A. R. Rahman. He is the talent behind some of the most successful and recognisable tracks for India's biggest advertising campaigns including Vodafone, Coca-Cola, Levi's, Titan, Garnier, Lakme, Reliance, Canon, Sony, Pond's, Cadbury Dairy Milk and countless more.

In addition to advertising, McCleary continues to make his mark in Bollywood. He composed & produced all the tracks and background music for the recently released film Waiting. In 2015 he won the Best Composer Award for the Film Margarita with a Straw at the Asian Film Awards. He also created the critically acclaimed background score for Dibakar Banerjee's 2012 political thriller Shanghai as well as contributing music for several other films including Shaitan, Kahaani, Love Sex aur Dhokha, Shaandaar, Bombay Velvet and Chennai Express. He composed the background score and a few tracks for Bejoy Nambiar's second film, David and then turned into a full-fledged Bollywood music director for Rohan Sippy's 2013 film, Nautanki Saala. He also created the background score and one track for the 2014 film, Shaadi Ke Side Effects.

TV Dinners
TV Dinners was McCleary's debut album of English songs. The album consists of songs that Mccleary composed and wrote for major TV advertising brands like Vodafone, Levi's, Audi, Titan and Lakmé. He has extended these 45-second jingles into full-length songs by adding new composition and lyrics so that instead of sounding like jingles, they sound like tracks from various artists that were placed in TV ad films. Featuring his own vocals on half the album, it also features the singers Anushka Manchanda, Shalmali Kholgade, Monica Dogra and Mauli Dave. Five music videos directed by him have been released for tracks from this album.

The Bartender
Going by the stage name of The Bartender, McCleary has three albums released, Classic Bollywood: Shaken not Stirred (2011), B Seventy (2013) and Classic Bollywood with a Twist (2014). The first album re-invents Bollywood songs from the '50s and '60s in a jazzy, seductive style and includes hit songs such as Khoya Khoya Chand (featured in Bejoy Nambiar's film Shaitan) and Tum Jo Mil Gaye Ho from the Coca-Cola advertisement directed by Dibakar Banerjee.

The second album, B Seventy, was created in honour of Amitabh Bachchan and was released as a dedication to him on his 70th birthday. It features revamped versions of his most iconic hit film songs, combining reggae, cabaret and motown while staying true to the original soul of the songs.

The third album, Classic Bollywood with a Twist, was launched by Bollywood actor Ranveer Singh. In this album, McCleary has chosen some of the most loved songs from the 50s, 60s and 70s and reinterpreted them with jazzy, seductive and mischievous flare using various genres and a predominantly live band feel. McCleary has been quoted saying, 'A beautiful song is like a beautiful woman. The musical arrangements are like the clothes that she wears. The music recordings, much like clothes, may appear old and outdated to the younger generation, but the beauty of the song composition and lyrics are eternal. My goal is to give that beautiful song new clothes that suit and enhance her beauty for all to see afresh and enjoy. I personally also still love listening to the old recordings.'

The Bartender as an artist includes Suman Sridhar, Shalmali Kholgade, Shibani Dandekar, Rachel Varghese, Saba Azad and Mauli Dave on vocals, Vinay Lobo on guitar, Aditya Ashok on drums, Anand Bhagat on percussions, Ramon Ibrahim on keyboards, Rhys D'Souza on saxophone, Kishore Sodha on trumpet and Mikey McCleary on bass. It has in the past also included Anushka Manchanda, Monica Dogra and Sagarika Mukherjee on vocals, Merlin D'Souza on keyboards, and Warren Mendonsa on guitar.

Notable performances
 Amitabh Bachchan's 70th Birthday Celebrations
 Book Launch for Abu Jani – Sandeep Khosla's book, India Fantastique
 Blue Frog, Mumbai

Discography

Music albums

Films

References

18) http://kamlashow.com/2015/04/16/podcast-mikey-mccleary-on-creating-music-for-bollywood/

External links
 Official website

Living people
1969 births
Musicians from Chennai
People from Auckland
New Zealand music arrangers
New Zealand film score composers
New Zealand composers
Male composers
New Zealand expatriates in England
New Zealand expatriates in India
Expatriate musicians in India
Victoria University of Wellington alumni